Geno Washington & the Ram Jam Band are an England-based soul band.

Career
The Ram Jam Band were formed around 1964 by Pete Gage and Geoff Pullum. Before taking on Geno Washington, whom Gage knew from performing at the RAF Bentwaters US Air Force base, they had a Jamaican Blue Beat singer by the name of Errol Dixon front the band as they embarked on the London club circuit. Gage approached Washington to finance his demobbing to the US and to return to front the band as it seemed essential to have an American to perform US soul rather than the West Indian alternatives in London at that time.

Geno Washington was a US airman stationed in East Anglia who became well known for his impromptu performances in London nightclubs. In 1965, guitarist Pete Gage needed a singer to front his new band and replace the previous singer Errol Dixon, and asked Washington to join. When Washington was discharged from the US Air Force, he became the band's frontman. Their first single featuring Geno, "Shake, Shake, Senora" / "Akinla" released on Columbia was not a commercial success.

They released two live albums. Hand Clappin, Foot Stompin, Funky-Butt ... Live! was released in 1966, reached no.5 on the UK Albums Chart, and remained in the charts for 38 weeks.  It was followed up by Hipster Flipsters Finger Poppin' Daddies in 1967, which reached no.8 on the chart.  They also had some moderate hit singles released by the Pye label: "Water", "Hi Hi Hazel", "Que Sera Sera" and "Michael (the Lover)".

They managed to build up a strong following with the crowds and due to their touring and energetic performances. Like their Pye label mates and rivals, Jimmy James and the Vagabonds, they became popular with the mod scene.

The band broke up in the autumn of 1969 and the band members went their own ways while Geno Washington continued as a solo artist before returning to the United States. Keyboard player Geoffrey K. Pullum became an academic linguist, and is today a professor at the University of Edinburgh and a linguistics blogger at the Language Log and Lingua Franca websites.

Washington temporarily reformed the band between February and June 1971 with new band members Dave Watts (organ), Mo Foster (bass), Mike Jopp (guitar) and Grant Serpell (drums)

The band's name came from the Ram Jam Inn, an old coaching inn on the A1 (Great North Road) at Stretton, near Oakham, Rutland.

Since 2005, Geno Washington and The Ram Jam Band have been constantly playing shows. The current version of the band is: Geno Washington (Lead Vocals); Geoff Hemsley (Drums); Steve Bingham (Bass and Backing Vocals); Stuart Dixon (Guitar and Backing Vocals); Alan Whetton (Tenor Sax); and Allesandro Carnevali (Tenor Sax).

Former members
Geno Washington, lead vocals
Pete Gage, guitar
Lionel Kingham, saxophone
Buddy Beadle, saxophone
Geoff Pullum aka Jeff Wright, organ
John Roberts, bass
Pete Carney, bass
Herb Prestidge, drums
Clive Burrows, saxophone
Paul Turner, bass guitar
Keith O'Connell, Hammond Organ (1968 - 1969)

Early Les Blues-line-up
Tony Coe, double bass
later replaced by John Game, bass guitar
Colin Gilbert, piano/keyboards
Morton Lewis, guitar
Gerry Gillings, drums

Discography

Singles
"Shake, Shake, Senora" / "Akinla", Columbia 7621, 1965 (Ram Jam Band only)
"Water" / "Understanding", Piccadilly 7N 35312, UK No. 39, May 1966
"Hi Hi Hazel" / "Beach Bash", Piccadilly 7N 35329, UK No. 45, July 1966
"Que Sera Sera" / "All I Need", Piccadilly 7N 35346, UK No. 43, October 1966
"Michael (the Lover)" / "Gotta Hold on to My Love", Piccadilly 7N 35359, UK No. 39, December 1966
"Always" / "If You Knew" / "She Shot a Hole in My Soul" / "I've Been Hurt by Love", Piccadilly 7N 35392, 1967
"Tell It Like It Is"/"Girl I Want To Marry You", Piccadilly 7N 35403, 1967
"Different Strokes"/"You Got Me Hummin'", Pye 7N 17425, 1967
"I Can't Quit Her"/"Put Out The Fire Baby", Pye 7N 17570, 1968
"I Can't Let You Go"/"Bring It To Me Baby", Pye 7N 17649, 1968
"My Little Chickadee"/"Seven Eleven", Pye 7N 17745, 1969

EPs
Hi Piccadilly NEP.34054 – 1966
Different Strokes Pye 7N.17425 – 1967
Small Package of Hipsters Pye NEP.24302 -1968
Que Sera Sera Flashback FBEP.103 – 1980

 Holding on With Both Hands – Acid Jazz – 2012

Albums
Hand Clappin' Foot Stompin' Funky-Butt ... Live! – Piccadilly NPL 38026 – 1966 UK 5
Shake A Tail Feather – Piccadilly NPL.38029 – 1967
Hipsters, Flipsters, Finger-Poppin' Daddies – Piccadilly NPL.38032 – 1967 UK 8
Running Wild – Pye NSPL.18219 – 1968
Sifters, Shifters, Finger Clicking Mamas – Marble Arch MAL 816 (Mono) / MALS 816 (Stereo) – 1968  
Uptight – Marble Arch MALS 1162 – 1969
Golden Hour of Geno Washington & The Ram Jam Band – Golden Hour GSH 594 – 1975
Hand Clappin' Foot Stompin' Funky-Butt ... Live! (Reissue) – PYE NSPL 18618 – 1980

CD
Hip Shakin' Soul Breakin' Earthquakin' Live – PYE PYC 4018 – 1988
Hand Clappin Foot Stompin' Funky Butt Live – Repertoire REP 4189-WZ – 1991
Hipsters, Flipsters, Finger-Poppin' Daddies! – Repertoire REP 4190-WZ – 1991
Geno Washington VS. Jimmy James ... No Holds Barred Sequel NEX CD 169
Hand Clappin' Foot Stompin' Funky-Butt ... Live! & Hipsters Flipsters, Finger Poppin' Daddies! –  C5 CD 581 – 1995
Geno – Spectrum 5507692
My Bombers, Mey Dexy's, My Highs (The Sixties Studio Sessions) – Sequel MEMCD 973 – 1998
Geno! Geno! Geno! ... Live in the 60's – Sequel NXTCD 295 – 1998
Foot Stompin' Soul – Castle 1304 – 2006
Geno Washington and The Ram Jam Band Live at The Half Moon Putney – PQFMusic/Pete Quaife Foundation – 2014

References

External links
Brown Eyed Handsome Man – blog post about Geno Washington & The Ram Jam Band
 Geno Washington & The Ram Jam Band fan site
Geno Washington official Facebook
BBC Previews and Features
Bio by John Bush
Globaldogproductions.info
Capitol6000.com
Glasgowmods.co.uk

British pop music groups
British soul musical groups
Pye Records artists
British rhythm and blues boom musicians
Northern soul musicians
Musical groups established in 1965
Musical groups disestablished in 1969
Acid Jazz Records artists